Sir John Fraser Robertson  (3 August 1925 – 1 September 2001) was the Chief Ombudsman of New Zealand from 1986 to 1994. In this role, he was responsible for investigating complaints against central and local government agencies, including Ministers of the Crown.

Career
Robertson began his career as a draughting cadet in the Lands and Survey Department in 1942.
He served with the Royal New Zealand Air Force in the Pacific during the Second World War.
After returning to the public service he qualified as a chartered accountant.
He was a State Services Commissioner, Secretary of Defence and Secretary for Justice before being made an Ombudsman.  
He was appointed an Ombudsman in 1984, and in 1986 became Chief Ombudsman, holding office until 1994.
He was a Director of the International Ombudsman Institute (IOI) from 1988 and President of the IOI from 1992 until 1994.

Robertson was appointed a Commander of the Order of the British Empire in the 1982 Queen's Birthday Honours. In the 1994 Queen's Birthday Honours, he was made a Knight Commander of the Order of St Michael and St George.

References

}

1925 births
2001 deaths
New Zealand public servants
New Zealand Commanders of the Order of the British Empire
New Zealand Knights Commander of the Order of St Michael and St George